Gal-Erdene Soyol-Erdene (born 16 March 1996) is a Mongolian footballer who plays for the Erchim FC of the Mongolian Premier League, and the Mongolian national team.

Club career
Soyol-Erdene was spotted and selected to play for the youth team of Erchim FC in 2011. He was promoted to Erchim's senior team of the Mongolian Premier League in 2013. With the club, he made two appearances in the 2013 AFC President's Cup, including in a 0–4 defeat to Balkan FK of Turkmenistan in the final rounds. He also made four appearances in the 2014 edition of the tournament and scored two goals, both in a match against Svay Rieng FC of Cambodia.

In January 2016 Soyol-Erdene, along with Erchim FC and Mongolia national team coach Zorigtyn Battulga and 15 year old Ganbold Ganbayar of Khoromkhon FC, spent a month training at The Hive Stadium with English club Barnet F.C. of League Two.

International career
Soyol-Erdene participated with the Mongolia under-23 team in 2016 AFC U-23 Championship qualification. In June 2017 head coach Michael Weiß named him to Mongolia's roster for 2018 AFC U-23 Championship qualification which was scheduled to take place the following month. Mongolia was part of Group H along with Thailand, Indonesia, and Malaysia.

Soyol-Erdene made his senior international debut on 21 July 2014 in a 2015 EAFF East Asian Cup match against the Northern Mariana Islands. He also scored his first senior international goal in the match, an eventual 4–0 victory. Soyol-Erdene was later named to Mongolia's squad for 2018 FIFA World Cup qualification. He has also represented Mongolia at youth levels, including as part of the squad for 2016 AFC U-23 Championship qualification. Mongolia competed in Group J against China, Laos, and Singapore.

International goals
Scores and results list Mongolia's goal tally first.

Honours

Club
Mongolian Premier League Winner (3): 2013, 2015, 2016
Mongolian Premier League Runner-up (1): 2014
Mongolia Super Cup (1): 2016
 Source(s):

References

External links
 MFF profile
 
 
 

1996 births
Living people
Mongolian footballers
Mongolia international footballers
Association football forwards
Mongolian National Premier League players